Saints Tygrius and Eutropius (d. 405) were two early Roman martyrs who supported Saint John Chrysostom at the time of his exile.
Eutropius was tortured and died, while Tygrius was exiled, but both are considered martyrs.
Their feast day is 12 January.

Lives

Tygrius and Eutropius were supporters of the exiled Saint John Chrysostom, and were arrested on false charges of trying to burn down the cathedral in Constantinople.
Eutropius was tortured and died of his injuries in 405, while Tygrius was exiled to Asia Minor.
Tygrius, priest, and Eutropius, lector, who suffered in the time of the emperor Arcadius (r. 383–408), are honoured on 12 January.

Butler's account

The hagiographer Alban Butler wrote,

Doney's account 

Mgr. Doney, in the Grande vie des saints (1872) wrote,

Notes

Sources

Saints from Constantinople
405 deaths